"Nowhere2go" is a song by American rapper Earl Sweatshirt and is the first single from his third studio album, Some Rap Songs. It was released on November 8, 2018.

Critical reception
The single received a positive reception. Pitchfork's Sheldon Pearce states "In less than two minutes, he riffs about isolationism and its causes, not liking stuff but having to go outside anyway. But because it’s Earl, there's a sense of solace that comes with all this."

Charts

Release history

References

2018 songs
2018 singles
Earl Sweatshirt songs
Songs written by Earl Sweatshirt